"Infinite" is a song by American rapper Eminem from his debut album of the same name (1996). It was released along with the rest of the album on November 12, 1996, via Web Entertainment. Recording sessions took place at Bassment Studios in Ferndale, Michigan, produced by Denaun Porter, under the stage name Kon Artis.

It is not officially available on any online music stores, however on November 18, 2016, five days after the 20th anniversary of the album, Eminem posted a remaster and a remix of the song, made by the Bass Brothers, to his Vevo channel, made available digitally for the first time.

The song peaked at number 97 on the Billboard Hot 100 and at number 37 on the Hot R&B/Hip-Hop Songs chart.

Personnel

"Infinite"
Marshall Mathers – main artist, vocals, songwriter, co-producer
Denaun Porter – producer, songwriter
Mathew "DJ Butterfinger" Ruby – scratches
Kevin Wilder – recording, mixing
Robert "Flipside" Handy – recording, mixing

"Infinite (F.B.T. Remix)"
Marshall Mathers – main artist, vocals, songwriter
Jeff Bass – producer
Mark Bass – producer
Jake Bass – co-producer

Charts

References

1996 songs
2016 songs
Eminem songs
Songs written by Eminem
Songs written by Denaun Porter